Casuarina pauper is a tree from the family Casuarinaceae, native to a band across the drier, inland areas of southern Australia. C. pauper is known as a poorer, stunted form of the closely related  Casuarina cristata .
Common names include black oak and belah.

Description
Casuarina pauper is a dioecious tree, 5 to 15 metres tall and up to 0.5 metre in diameter. Specimens growing in the open often develop a dense crown, and when growing in dense stands the main stem tends to be straight for more than half the total height.

The foliage is not composed of true leaves but rather of jointed branchlets that function like leaves. The true leaves are tiny, tooth-like structures protruding from around the top of each joint. Leaves are strongly waxy, densely and very shortly hairy, with teeth spreading to recurved.

Bark is hard, dark brown to blackish, with a tight scaly appearance.
Sapwood is wide and creamy coloured, heartwood is reddish brown and very dense.

Seedlings consist of both deciduous and persistent branches similar in morphology. Whorls of 4 leaf teeth are closely oppressed to the branch at the joint, gradually increasing in number, with internodes being 0.3–0.4 cm long.

Adult plants consist of both deciduous and permanent branches, which are noticeably different in morphology. The deciduous branches are robust, dark olive-green to grey, consisting of mostly pendent branchlets 10–20 cm long, shed after 2–3 seasons. Erect leaf teeth occur in whorls of 9–16, consist of internodes of approximately 0.7–1.5 cm long, spreading to recurved.

As the species is dioecious, male and female inflorescences are on separate trees. Male flowers are located on small slender terminal spikes at the end of deciduous branches. Female flowers are grouped in alternating whorls of 9–16, eventually forming a cone, which is grey, subspherical to rounded oblong in shape measuring 1.5–3 x 1.5–2.5 cm. Bracteoles are short and tawny, pubescent and opening widely at dehiscence. Fruits are dull yellow-brown, elliptical, flattened, up to 5.5–7.0mm long.

Taxonomy
The word 'casuarina' is derived from the word kasuari (the Malay word for cassowary), in reference to the similarity of the tree's drooping branches to the feathers of the bird. 
The word 'pauper' is Latin (meaning poor, scanty, meagre), relating to the smaller, poorer habit of this species when compared to C.cristata.

Previous nomenclature – Casuarina stricta ssp. pauper, Casuarina cristata, Casuarina pauper ssp. pauper, Casuarina lepidophloia, Casuarina cambagei, Casuarina cristata subsp. pauper (Miq.) L.A.S. Johnson.

Common names – Black Oak, Inland Sheoak, Belah.

Distribution

C. pauper is widespread across a band of southern Australia, including western New South Wales, northwestern Victoria, inland South Australia, Central Australia, southwestern Queensland, and southern inland Western Australia.

C. pauper is generally found growing in groves ranging from ≤1 to 10ha. This species can withstand compact clay soils and high alkalinity.

The species occurs in the altitudinal range of 400–500m, surviving in areas where the hottest month is 32–36 °C and 3–7 °C in the coldest month, being moderately tolerant of frosts. Generally located in areas averaging 200–350mm of rainfall per year.

Reproduction and dispersal
 C. pauper  produces abundant viable seed, with regeneration success likely to be inhibited during periods of insufficient soil moisture required for seedling survival. Seeds consist of a papery transparent wing with conspicuous midrib, and may be dispersed by wind, surface run-off, and animals such as ants and emus.
The species also regenerates from basal shoots. Vegetative recruits tend to have a high survival rate, although the survival of both forms of recruits under rabbit and kangaroo grazing is extremely low, as both are highly palatable. When present at low densities, C.pauper tends to reproduce sexually, while established groves extend mostly from the fringes through vegetative shoots, increasing the local area occupied by the individuals.

Uses
 C. pauper  is fast growing, and improves the levels of nitrogen in the soils, produced by biological fixation, with their roots fixing atmospheric nitrogen through nodules that contain specially adapted symbiotic bacteria of the genus Frankia spp.. This allows Casuarina species to grow on nutrient poor soils, and other limiting environments such as sandy soils or granite outcrops.
  
Casuarina species may be of benefit to farming communities as they provide an excellent source of shade, shelter and erosion control on farms, and to a limited extent, is a source of emergency drought fodder.
The timber they provide is hard and durable, suitable for fencing, woodturning and firewood.

Indigenous  people traditionally use the hard wood of Casuarina species for making a number of implements  such as boomerangs, spears, clapping sticks, digging sticks, shields and clubs. Young shoots and branchlets can be chewed to reduce thirst, and cones may also eaten .
Casuarina cones can also be soaked in water to provide a lemon flavoured drink.

Conservation
Not considered rare or endangered.

References
 
 
 
 
 
 
 
 
 

 

pauper
Fagales of Australia
Trees of Australia
Flora of New South Wales
Flora of Queensland
Flora of South Australia
Flora of Victoria (Australia)
Flora of Western Australia
Dioecious plants
Trees of Mediterranean climate